Joakim Nyström was the defending champion but lost in the third round to Jakob Hlasek.

Boris Becker won in the final 6–4, 6–4, 7–5 against Stefan Edberg.

Seeds
The top eight seeds received a bye into the second round.

Draw

Finals

Top half

Section 1

Section 2

Bottom half

Section 3

Section 4

References
 1987 Pilot Pen Classic Draw - Men's Singles

Pilot Pen Classic - Singles